Flesquières is a commune in the Nord department in northern France.

Heraldry

See also
Communes of the Nord department
Marcel Gaumont. Sculpture on church

References

Communes of Nord (French department)